Atilogwu is a spirited youth dance from the Igbo ethnic group of Nigeria that focuses on vigorous body movement and often includes acrobatics. In the Igbo language, the word itself "Atilogwu" translates into "has magic, as in sorcery/witchcraft".

The name stems from rumors that bewitchment or magic potions had to be involved if the children of the village could perform so exuberantly and energetically, while making it look so effortless. The tempo of the dance matches the tempo of the music, which is dependent on the beat of the drum and ogene, a metal gong instrument. The dance is usually performed during festivals and the festivity will also include exotic dishes created from authentic Nigerian recipes, served buffet style.

References

Igbo music